Abell 2152 is a bimodal galaxy cluster and one of three clusters comprising the Hercules Supercluster. It contains 3 BCGs; the S0 lenticular UGC 10204, the pair UGC 10187, and the SA0 unbarred lenticular CGCG 108-083.  In total there are 41 galaxies which are confirmed to be members of the cluster. The cluster is classified as a Bautz-Morgan type III and Rood-Sastry class F cluster, indicating morphological irregularity and perhaps dynamical youth.   It is receding from the Milky Way galaxy with a velocity of 12385 km/s.

Abell 2152 is the nearest cluster in which significant gravitational lensing of a background source has been observed.  The arc-like background galaxy, known as J160529.52+162633.9, lies at a redshift z=0.1423 and has been magnified by a factor ~1.9 due to the lensing effect.

References

Hercules (constellation)
2152
Abell richness class 1
Galaxy clusters
Hercules Superclusters